Scientific American, informally abbreviated SciAm or sometimes SA, is an American popular science magazine. Many famous scientists, including Albert Einstein and Nikola Tesla, have contributed articles to it. In print since 1845, it is the oldest continuously published magazine in the United States. Scientific American is owned by Springer Nature, which in turn is a subsidiary of Holtzbrinck Publishing Group.

History

Scientific American was founded by inventor and publisher Rufus Porter in 1845 as a four-page weekly newspaper. The first issue of the large-format New York City newspaper was released on August 28, 1845.

Throughout its early years, much emphasis was placed on reports of what was going on at the U.S. Patent Office. It also reported on a broad range of inventions including perpetual motion machines, an 1860 device for buoying vessels by Abraham Lincoln, and the universal joint which now can be found in nearly every automobile manufactured. Current issues include a "this date in history" section, featuring excerpts from articles originally published 50, 100, and 150 years earlier. Topics include humorous incidents, wrong-headed theories, and noteworthy advances in the history of science and technology. It started as a weekly publication in August 1845 before turning into a monthly in November 1921.

Porter sold the publication to Alfred Ely Beach and Orson Desaix Munn a mere ten months after founding it. Until 1948, it remained owned by Munn & Company. Under Munn's grandson, Orson Desaix Munn III, it had evolved into something of a "workbench" publication, similar to the twentieth-century incarnation of Popular Science.

In the years after World War II, the magazine fell into decline. In 1948, three partners who were planning on starting a new popular science magazine, to be called The Sciences, purchased the assets of the old Scientific American instead and put its name on the designs they had created for their new magazine. Thus the partnerspublisher Gerard Piel, editor Dennis Flanagan, and general manager Donald H. Miller, Jr.essentially created a new magazine. Miller retired in 1979, Flanagan and Piel in 1984, when Gerard Piel's son Jonathan became president and editor; circulation had grown fifteen-fold since 1948. In 1986, it was sold to the Holtzbrinck Publishing Group of Germany, which has owned it until the Springer-Nature merger. In the fall of 2008, Scientific American was put under the control of Holtzbrinck's Nature Publishing Group division.

Donald Miller died in December 1998, Gerard Piel in September 2004 and Dennis Flanagan in January 2005. Mariette DiChristina became editor-in-chief after John Rennie stepped down in June 2009, and stepped down herself in September 2019. In April 2020, Laura Helmuth assumed the role of editor-in-chief.

The magazine is the oldest continually published magazine in the United States.

In 2009 the publisher notified collegiate libraries that yearly subscription prices for the magazine would increase by nearly 500% for print and 50% for online access to $1,500 yearly.

In 2013, Danielle N. Lee, a female scientist who blogged at Scientific American, was called a "whore" in an email by an editor at the science website Biology Online after refusing to write professional content without compensation. When Lee, outraged about the email, wrote a rebuttal on her Scientific American blog, the editor-in-chief of Scientific American, Mariette DiChristina, removed the post. DiChristina cited legal reasons for removing the blog. The editor at Biology Online was fired after the incident.

The controversy widened in the ensuing days. The magazine's blog editor, Bora Zivkovic, was the subject of allegations of sexual harassment by another blogger, Monica Byrne. Although the alleged incident had occurred about a year earlier, editor Mariette DiChristina informed readers that the incident had been investigated and resolved to Byrne's satisfaction. However, the incident involving Lee had prompted Byrne to reveal the identity of Zivkovic, following the latter's support of Lee. Zivkovic admitted the incident with Byrne had taken place. He apologized to Byrne, and referred to the incident as "singular", stating that his behavior was not "engaged in before or since".

Zivkovic resigned from the board of Science Online, the popular science blogging conference that he co-founded with Anton Zuiker. Following Zivkovic's admission, several female bloggers, including other bloggers for the magazine, wrote their own accounts, alleging additional incidents of sexual harassment, although none of these accounts were independently investigated. A day after these new revelations, Zivkovic resigned his position at Scientific American.

Offices of the Scientific American has included 37 Park Row in Manhattan as well as the Woolworth Building in 1915 when it was just finished 2 years earlier in 1913. The Woolworth Building was at the time one of the first skycrapers in the city and the tallest one in the world.

International editions

Scientific American published its first foreign edition in 1890, the Spanish-language La America Cientifica. Publication was suspended in 1905, and another 63 years would pass before another foreign-language edition appeared: In 1968, an Italian edition, Le Scienze, was launched, and a Japanese edition, followed three years later. A new Spanish edition, Investigación y Ciencia was launched in Spain in 1976, followed by a French edition, in France in 1977, and a German edition, in Germany in 1978. A Russian edition V Mire Nauki was launched in the Soviet Union in 1983, and continues in the present-day Russian Federation. Kexue (科学, "Science" in Chinese), a simplified Chinese edition launched in 1979, was the first Western magazine published in the People's Republic of China. Founded in Chongqing, the simplified Chinese magazine was transferred to Beijing in 2001. Later in 2005, a newer edition, Global Science (环球科学), was published instead of Kexue, which shut down due to financial problems. The Hungarian edition Tudomány existed between 1984 and 1992. In 1986, an Arabic edition, was published. In 2002, a Portuguese edition was launched in Brazil.

Today, Scientific American publishes 18 foreign-language editions around the globe: Arabic, Brazilian Portuguese, Simplified Chinese, Traditional Chinese, Czech, Dutch, French, German, Greek, Hebrew, Italian, Japanese, Korean, Lithuanian (discontinued after 15 issues), Polish, Romanian, Russian, and Spanish. From 1902 to 1911, Scientific American supervised the publication of the Encyclopedia Americana, which during some of that period was known as The Americana. Some famous individuals who penned articles in the magazine included Albert Einstein, Thomas Edison, Jonas Salk, Marie Curie, Stephen Hawking, Franklin D. Roosevelt, Stephen Jay Gould, Bill Gates, Nikola Tesla, and more.

Editors
 Rufus Porter (1792–1884), first editor (1845–1847)
 Orson Desaix Munn (1824–1907), second editor (1847–1907)
 Charles Allen Munn (1859–1924), third editor (1907–1924)
 Orson Desaix Munn II (1883–1958), fourth editor (1924–1947)
 Dennis Flanagan (1919–2005), fifth editor (1947–1984).
 Jonathan Piel, sixth editor-in-chief (1984–1994)
 John Rennie, seventh editor-in-chief (1994–2009)
 Mariette DiChristina, eighth editor-in-chief (2009–2019)
 Laura Helmuth, ninth editor-in-chief (April 2020 – present)

Special issues

 Communications, Computers, and Networks – September 1991

Website
In March 1996, Scientific American launched its own website that included articles from current and past issues, online-only features, daily news, special reports, and trivia,  among other things.  The website introduced a paywall in April 2019, with readers able to view a few articles for free each month.

Columns

Notable features have included:
 Martin Gardner's Mathematical Games column
 Douglas Hofstadter's Metamagical Themas
 The Amateur Scientist column
 A. K. Dewdney's Computer Recreations column
 Michael Shermer's Skeptic column
 James Burke's Connections

Television
From 1990 to 2005 Scientific American produced a television program on PBS called Scientific American Frontiers with hosts Woodie Flowers and Alan Alda.

Books

From 1983 to 1997, Scientific American has produced an encyclopedia set of volumes from their publishing division, the Scientific American Library. These books were not sold in retail stores, but as a Book of the Month Club selection priced from $24.95 to $32.95. Topics covered dozens of areas of scientific knowledge and included in-depth essays on: The Animal Mind; Atmosphere, Climate, and Change; Beyond the Third Dimension; Cosmic Clouds; Cycles of Life • Civilization and the Biosphere; The Discovery of Subatomic Particles; Diversity and the Tropical Rain Forest; Earthquakes and Geological Discovery; Exploring Planetary Worlds; Gravity's Fatal Attraction; Fire; Fossils and the History of Life; From Quarks to the Cosmos; A Guided Tour of the Living Cell; Human Diversity; Perception; The Solar System; Sun and Earth; The Science of Words (Linguistics); The Science of Musical Sound; The Second Law (of Thermodynamics); Stars; Supercomputing and the Transformation of Science.

Scientific American launched a publishing imprint in 2010 in partnership with Farrar, Straus and Giroux.
  A "collection of updated or adapted Scientific American articles and shorter pieces... ". According to editor Andrea Gawrylewski 'The reader will quickly notice a common theme. ... there really is no debate where the science is concerned'". Contributors include Seth Shostak, Paul Offit, Richard Dawkins and Harriet Hall.

Scientific and political debate
In April 1950, the U.S. Atomic Energy Commission ordered Scientific American to cease publication of an issue containing an article by Hans Bethe that appeared to reveal classified information about the thermonuclear hydrogen bomb. Subsequent review of the material determined that the AEC had overreacted. The incident was important for the "new" Scientific Americans history, as the AEC's decision to burn 3,000 copies of an early press-run of the magazine containing the offending material appeared to be "book burning in a free society" when publisher Gerard Piel leaked the incident to the press.

The May 2007 issue featured a column by Michael Shermer calling for a United States pullout from the Iraq War. In response, Wall Street Journal online columnist James Taranto jokingly called Scientific American "a liberal political magazine".

An editorial in the September 2016 issue of Scientific American attacked U.S. presidential candidate Donald Trump for "anti-science" attitudes and rhetoric. This marked the first time that the publication forayed into commenting on U.S. presidential politics.

In the October 2020 issue of the magazine, it endorsed Joe Biden for the 2020 presidential election, citing Donald Trump's rejection of scientific evidence, especially during the COVID-19 pandemic in the United States. In the column reporting the endorsement, the magazine's editors said, "Scientific American has never endorsed a presidential candidate in its 175-year history. This year we are compelled to do so. We do not do this lightly."

Awards
 2010: IQ Award for the German edition Spektrum der Wissenschaft

See also

 14145 Sciam, asteroid named after Scientific American
 American Scientist
 Discover (magazine)
 Albert Graham Ingalls, former editor and author of an amateur astronomy column
 New Scientist
 Scientific American Mind

References

External links

 
 
 
 

 
1845 establishments in the United States
Magazines established in 1845
Magazines published in New York City
Monthly magazines published in the United States
Nature Research academic journals
Popular science magazines
Science and technology magazines published in the United States